Admiral Stevens may refer to:

John Stevens (Royal Navy officer) (1900–1989), British Royal Navy vice admiral
Robert Stevens (Royal Navy officer) (born 1948), British Royal Navy rear admiral
Thomas H. Stevens Jr. (1819–1896), U.S. Navy rear admiral